This is a list of Indonesian Twenty20 International cricketers.

In April 2018, the ICC decided to grant full Twenty20 International (T20I) status to all its members. Therefore, all Twenty20 matches played between Indonesia and other ICC members after 1 January 2019 will be eligible to have T20I status.

This list comprises all members of the Indonesia cricket team who have played at least one T20I match. It is initially arranged in the order in which each player won his first Twenty20 cap. Where more than one player won his first Twenty20 cap in the same match, those players are listed alphabetically by surname. Indonesia played their first matches with T20I status during a tour of Japan, followed by the 2022–23 ICC Men's T20 World Cup East Asia-Pacific Qualifier in October 2022, in Sano.

Key

List of players
Statistics are correct as of 18 October 2022.

References 

Indonesia
Indonesia in international cricket